Victor Cruz may refer to:

 Victor Cruz (American football) (born 1986), American football player
 Víctor Cruz (baseball) (1957–2004), Major League Baseball pitcher
 Victor Hernández Cruz (born 1949), Puerto Rican poet
 Victor Santa Cruz (born 1972), American football coach and former player